William Riley Ritchie Sr. (January 25, 1876 – January 18, 1970) was an American college football player and coach, mathematics professor, and civil engineer. He was the second head football coach at Baylor University, serving for on year, in 1901 and compiling a record of 5–3. He was also the chairman of Baylor's mathematics department. Ritchie graduated in 1900 from the University of Georgia, where he played football.

In 1906, Ritchie was residing at Campbell, Texas, working as a mathematics professor at Henry College. He later worked a civil engineer for the Missouri–Kansas–Texas Railroad subsequently went into various businesses in banking, livestock, logging, and oil. Ritchie  retired in 1954 and moved to Carmichael, California in 1960. He died on January 18, 1970, at a hospital in Sacramento, California.

Head coaching record

References

1876 births
1970 deaths
19th-century players of American football
American football tackles
American railway civil engineers
Baylor Bears football coaches
Georgia Bulldogs football players
People from Carmichael, California
People from Rabun County, Georgia
Coaches of American football from Georgia (U.S. state)
Players of American football from Georgia (U.S. state)